Philip Wilson (born 16 October 1960 in Hemsworth, West Yorkshire) is a former professional footballer, who played for Bolton Wanderers, Huddersfield Town, York City, Scarborough and Stafford Rangers.

References 

 

1960 births
Living people
English footballers
People from Hemsworth
Association football midfielders
English Football League players
Bolton Wanderers F.C. players
Huddersfield Town A.F.C. players
York City F.C. players
Scarborough F.C. players
Stafford Rangers F.C. players
Footballers from Yorkshire
Macclesfield Town F.C. players